The Klondike Highway is a highway that runs from the Alaska Panhandle through the province of British Columbia and the territory of Yukon in Canada, linking the coastal town of Skagway, Alaska, to Dawson City, Yukon. Its route somewhat parallels the route used by prospectors in the 1898 Klondike Gold Rush.

In both British Columbia and Yukon, the highway is marked as Yukon Highway 2. In Alaska, the Highway is marked as Alaska Route 98 (as in "route of 1898"). Until 1978, the unopened section between the Yukon–BC border and Carcross had no official highway number, while the section north of Carcross to the Alaska Highway was Highway 5, and the section from Stewart Crossing to Dawson was Highway 3. The BC section is now maintained by the Yukon government as a natural extension of Highway 2.

Route description

History

South Klondike Highway
The original  section known locally as the Carcross Road was actually made into a part of the Alaska Highway in 1942, until the Marsh Lake route was opened the next year. As Yukon Highway 5, it formed a loop road with Highway 6, the Tagish Road (now numbered as 8). It was renumbered as Highway 2 in 1978, being incorporated into the Klondike Highway designation. The road underwent alignment improvements during the 1980s.

Construction of the "Carcross-Skagway Road" began in the 1950s, was abandoned partway up a mountain from Skagway, and resumed in 1976-1977 when   the Captain William Moore Bridge was constructed. The entire road was completed between Skagway and Carcross in August 1978. It was only open for a few weeks before seasonal closure.  The first full summer season of use was in 1979.

The highway originally was built for tourist traffic, but in 1986 became important as a commercial transportation route, coincident with what seemed to be inevitable abandonment of the White Pass and Yukon Route railway (WP&YR).  The new owners of the Faro mine secured government agreement to open the highway for trucking. The last winter closure ended in the spring of 1986.

The Carcross-Skagway Road portion of the highway underwent substantial rerouting, widening and (cold mix) paving in the late 1980s and early 1990s. Mining ore trucks and fuel tankers are the primary current (2013) commercial users of the highway, which also remains a popular tourist route (cars, RVs, buses), and provides a means for the WP&YR to offer economically-priced train excursions connecting at Fraser to buses based at Skagway for the cruise ship industry, or to/from Carcross and Whitehorse to the north.

North Klondike Highway
The quality of roads from Whitehorse to Dawson City prior to 1950 was poor and only for the hardiest of travelers and motorized vehicles.  The "Whitehorse-Mayo Road," Yukon's original Highway 2, extended along today's route from Whitehorse to Stewart Crossing, then turned northeast to Mayo, Elsa and Keno City. The last of three bridges was finished in 1960 to replace ferries at Carmacks, Pelly Crossing and Stewart Crossing.

Yukon's original Highway 3, the Dawson-Mayo Road, was opened in September 1955 between Stewart Crossing and Dawson City.  The Dawson-Mayo Road became part of Highway 2 in 1978 and was named the Klondike Highway, while the road northeast from Stewart Crossing became Highway 11, and was later named the Silver Trail.

Even as of 1979, the entire Klondike Highway was gravel, but by 1982, some paving had been laid down as far north as Carmacks.  Rebuilding and some rerouting was completed in the late 1980s.

Approximately, the first  of the North Klondike Highway are still often known as the Mayo Road to the residents of Whitehorse.  Although kilometric distance markers have been in place since the early 1980s, residents in this area still identify their residential address as a mile measurement along the Mayo Road.

Major intersections

See also
 List of Alaska Routes
 List of British Columbia provincial highways
 List of Yukon territorial highways
 Overland Trail (Yukon)
 Skagway - Fraser Border Crossing

References

Sources
 Internet travelog of Jim Teresco. Specifically Skagway, June 23, 2001, pictures 11 and 12 and their associated captions. Retrieved 2005-02-18.

External links

Transportation in Municipality of Skagway Borough, Alaska
Yukon territorial highways
Roads in British Columbia
State highways in Alaska